Antoni Jan Łaciak (23 June 1939 in Szczyrk – 6 February 1989 in Katowice) is a Polish former ski jumper who competed in the 1960s. He won a silver medal in the individual normal hill at the 1962 FIS Nordic World Ski Championships in Zakopane.

Łaciak's best non-world championships finish was 8th in the normal hill event at Garmisch-Partenkirchen in 1963. He also competed in the normal hill event at the 1964 Winter Olympics.

References

External links

1939 births
1989 deaths
People from Bielsko County
FIS Nordic World Ski Championships medalists in ski jumping
Sportspeople from Silesian Voivodeship
Polish male ski jumpers
Olympic ski jumpers of Poland
Ski jumpers at the 1964 Winter Olympics
20th-century Polish people